Nemophas sumbaensis is a species of beetle in the family Cerambycidae. It was described by Vitali in 2013. It is known from Indonesia.

References

sumbaensis
Beetles described in 2013